An adversary is generally considered to be a person, group, or force that opposes and/or attacks.

Adversary may also refer to:

 Satan ("adversary" in Hebrew), in Judeo-Christian religion

Entertainment

Fiction
 Adversary (comics), villain from the Marvel comics universe
 The mysterious antagonist who invaded the homelands in the comic book series Fables

Music
 Ad·ver·sary, Canadian industrial musician

Law
 Adversarial system, a system of law commonly used in common-law countries
 Adversary proceeding, proceeding used in bankruptcy processes

Science
 Adversarial collaboration, a scientific experiment

Computer science
 Adversary (cryptography), a malicious entity in cryptography whose aim is to prevent the users of the cryptosystem from achieving their goal
 Adversary model, in online algorithms, used to show competitiveness of randomized algorithms

Other
 Adversarial purchasing, in business strategic management

See also
 The Adversary (disambiguation)
 Opposition (disambiguation)
 Enemy